Falk may refer to:
 
 Falk (name), including origin and list of people with this name
 Falk, California, a ghost town
 Falk Township, Minnesota
 "Falk" (short story), a 1901 short story by Joseph Conrad
 Postal abbreviation of Falkirk, an area of Scotland

See also
Falx (disambiguation)
Faulk (disambiguation)
 Falck (disambiguation)